Petya is a Bulgarian female given name of Slavic origin. It is also a Russian diminutive name derived from the male given name Pyotr. 

Petya may also refer to:

 Petya (malware), a family of encrypting ransomware discovered in 2016
 Petya-class frigate, the NATO reporting name for a class of light frigates designed in the 1950s and built for the Soviet Navy

People
 Petya Barakova (born 1994), Bulgarian volleyball player
 Petya Dubarova (1962–1979), Bulgarian poet
 Petya Gavazova (born 1968), Bulgarian figure skater
 Petya Lukanova (born 1969), Bulgarian sports shooter
 Petya Lyuty (died 1919), Ukrainian military commander
 Petya Minkova, Bulgarian cyclist
 Petya Nedelcheva (born 1983), Bulgarian badminton player
 Petya Parvanova (born 1960), Bulgarian security officer and politician
 Petya Pendareva (born 1971), Bulgarian sprinter
 Petya Petkova (born 1991), Bulgarian footballer
 Petya Strashilova (born 1965), Bulgarian middle-distance runner
 Petya Tsekova (born 1986), Bulgarian volleyball player

Fictional characters
 Petya Rostov, character in Leo Tolstoy's War and Peace

See also
 Petia (disambiguation)
 Pyotr